Deportivo Masatepe is a Nicaraguan football team.

History
Based in Masatepe, they finally opened their own stadium in summer 2008 after having staged home games in the Estadio Olímpico de San Marcos and Estadio Cacique Diriangén in the seasons before.

They played their last season in the Nicaraguan Premier Division in the 2008/09 season after winning promotion in summer 2003.

Achievements
Copa de Nicaragua: 1
 2005

List of Managers

  Martín Mena (2004)
  Glen Blanco (2005–2006)
  Edward Urroz (2008)

References

Football clubs in Nicaragua